"The City Is Mine" is the second single from rapper Jay-Z's second album In My Lifetime, Vol. 1.  It was released on February 3, 1998. It features vocals from Blackstreet and production from Blackstreet member Teddy Riley. Riley samples "You Gonna Make Me Love Somebody Else" by The Jones Girls for the song's beat, while Blackstreet interpolates "You Belong to the City" by Glenn Frey and Jack Tempchin for the song's chorus. In addition, a young Chad Hugo plays saxophone on this song. The first verse is dedicated to the memory of his friend, The Notorious B.I.G.

Reception
"The City Is Mine" was a moderate commercial success reaching #52 on the Billboard Hot 100 and #38 on the UK Singles Chart. It was panned by critics for its commercial nature and poor interpolation of Glenn Frey and Jack Tempchin's "You Belong to the City.". AllMusic's John Bush considers the beat to be the "most commercial" beat on In My Lifetime, Vol. 1 and the interpolation to be "unfortunate." Steve Juon of RapReviews.com describes that track as "some cotton candy sugary rap FLUFF" and its interpolation as a mistake, but still considers the lyrics to be "vintage Jigga."

Music Video
The video directed by Steve Carr was inspired by the 1995 film The Usual Suspects with actor Michael Rapaport portraying the detective interrogating Jay-Z.

Formats and track listings

US CD
 "The City Is Mine (Radio Edit)"
 "The City Is Mine (TV track)"
 "A Million and One Questions (Radio Edit)"

UK CD
 "The City Is Mine (Radio Edit)"
 "Intro / A Million And One Questions / Rhyme No More (Premier Radio Edit)"
 "The City Is Mine (Album Version)"
 "Dead Presidents II"

US Vinyl

A-Side
 "The City Is Mine (Radio Edit)"
 "The City Is Mine (LP Version)"

B-Side
 "The City Is Mine (TV Track)"
 "A Million and One Questions (Remix)"
 "A Million and One Questions (Remix) (TV Track)"

UK Vinyl

A-Side
 "The City Is Mine (Radio Edit)"
 "The City Is Mine (Dirty Version)"
 "The City Is Mine (Instrumental)"

B-Side
 "Face Off (Dirty Version)"
 "Face Off (Instrumental)"

Charts

Weekly charts

See also
List of songs recorded by Jay-Z

References

1998 singles
Blackstreet songs
Jay-Z songs
Songs written by Leon Huff
Songs written by Kenny Gamble
Songs written by Jack Tempchin
Songs written by Glenn Frey
Song recordings produced by Teddy Riley
Songs written by Jay-Z
Songs written by Teddy Riley
1997 songs
Roc-A-Fella Records singles
Def Jam Recordings singles
Jazz rap songs